Auburndale is one of the thirteen villages within the city of Newton in Middlesex County, Massachusetts, United States. It lies at the western end of Newton near the intersection of interstate highways 90 and 95. It is bisected by the Massachusetts Turnpike (Interstate 90). Auburndale is surrounded by three other Newton villages (West Newton, Waban, and Newton Lower Falls) as well as the city of Waltham and the Charles River.  Auburndale is the home of Williams and Burr elementary schools, as well as Lasell College.  Auburndale Square is the location of the Plummer Memorial Library, which is run by the Auburndale Community Library and no longer affiliated with the Newton Free Library, the Turtle Lane Playhouse, and many small businesses.

History
The first major settler in the area was William Robinson who built a house in 1678 on what is now Freeman Street. The oldest house in Auburndale stands at 473 Auburn Street and was built in 1730 by William Robinson.

Auburndale, once billed as Auburndale-on-the-Charles, was the home of Norumbega Park which closed in 1963. The park included rides, a zoo, and boating.  The nationally famous big band venue Totem Pole Ballroom was associated with Norumbega Park and closed in 1964. The area now contains over 80 acres of conservation land as well as access to the Charles River.

Transportation
Auburndale is divided into two parts by the Massachusetts Turnpike, which connects it to neighboring villages of Newton and downtown Boston. The village is located adjacent to the intersection of interstate highways 90 and 95.

A number of public transportation options connect Auburndale to neighboring communities. The MBTA Green Line's D Branch light rail line serves Auburndale at Woodland and Riverside stations, the latter being the line's terminus. Both stations have bus connections; Woodland station is served by MWRTA bus routes 1 and 8, while Riverside connects to MBTA bus route 558.

The MBTA Commuter Rail's Framingham/Worcester Line serves the village at Auburndale station, adjacent to the Massachusetts Turnpike. MBTA bus routes 505 and 558, which offer express service to downtown Boston, both stop at the station.

National Register historic sites

Nineteen places in Auburndale are on the National Register of Historic Places, as follows

Local Historic District
Established in 2005, the Auburndale Historic District includes approximately 275 properties and encompasses two National Register Districts.

Places of worship
Corpus Christi and St. Bernard's Parish, 41 Ash Street.
Episcopal Parish of the Messiah, 1900 Commonwealth Avenue.
Temple Reyim, 1860 Washington Street.
United Parish of Auburndale, 64 Hancock Street.

Points of interest
Auburndale Cove Park & Playground, West Pine Street.
Norumbega Park Conservation Area.
Turtle Lane Playhouse, 283 Melrose Street
Woodland Golf Club
Charles River Canoe and Kayak Company

See also
List of Registered Historic Places in Newton, Massachusetts

References

External links

Villages in Newton, Massachusetts
Villages in Massachusetts